Paschim Banga Gramin Bank is a 'premier  regional rural bank in India. It is under the ownership of Ministry of Finance , Government of India. It was established on 26 February 2007 in exercise of the powers conferred by Sub-section (1) of Section 23A of the Regional Rural Bank Act, 1976 (21 of 1976). The bank was established by the amalgamation of Howrah Gramin Bank, Bardhaman Gramin Bank and Mayurakshi Gramin Bank. The tagline of the bank is "Bank for U - Banking for All".

This bank is sponsored by UCO Bank and owned by the government of India, the government of West Bengal and UCO Bank. The shareholders of the bank are the Government of India (50%), UCO Bank (35%) and the Government of West Bengal (15%). The bank's head office is located at Tikiapara, Howrah, West Bengal.

As of 31 March 2019, the bank made a net profit  of

Bank structure
The bank operates in five districts of West Bengal State, namely, Howrah, Hooghly, Purba Bardhaman, Paschim Bardhaman and Birbhum, with its head office at Howrah, West Bengal.

It has 230 branches and 4 regional offices. The regional offices are in Howrah, Hooghly, Bardhaman, and Suri.

See also

 Banking in India
 List of banks in India
 Reserve Bank of India
 Regional Rural Bank
 Indian Financial System Code
 List of largest banks
 List of companies of India
 Make in India

References

External links
 PBGB website

Regional rural banks of India
Companies based in Howrah
2007 establishments in West Bengal
Banks established in 2007
Indian companies established in 2007